Nuttall's larkspur is a common name for two Delphinium species:

Delphinium nuttallii
Delphinium nuttallianum